Since its foundation in 1911, the football team representing Zamalek Sporting Club of Giza, Egypt has won the Egypt Cup 27 times and the Egyptian Super Cup four times. It has also scored many successful seasons in the Egyptian Premier League. On the international stage the club has frequently participated in the CAF Champions League and other tournaments run by the Confederation of African Football (CAF).

Seasons

References